Alia Royal Jordanian Flight 600 was a scheduled passenger flight from Queen Alia International Airport, Jordan to Seeb International Airport, Muscat, Oman, via Doha International Airport in Qatar. On 14 March 1979 it was being operated by a Boeing 727-2D3 jet airliner registered in Jordan as JY-ADU when, while carrying out a missed approach to Runway 34 at Doha at night, it flew into a thunderstorm, causing the aircraft to drop  into the ground. Sixty-four people were on board; of the 15 crew four died and two were seriously injured and 41 passengers were killed and six seriously injured; the aircraft was destroyed.

Investigation
The accident was due to the encounter with a downburst related to the thunderstorm and the effects of which exceeded the performance capability of the aircraft.

Aircraft
The aircraft was a three-engined Boeing 727-2D3 jet airliner registered JY-ADU with Boeing line number 1061, it first flew on 26 July 1974 in the United States and was delivered to Alia Royal Jordanian on 14 August 1974.

References
Notes

Bibliography

External links
 ASN report

Airliner accidents and incidents caused by weather
Aviation accidents and incidents in 1979
Accidents and incidents involving the Boeing 727
Aviation accidents and incidents in Qatar
Royal Jordanian accidents and incidents
1979 in Qatar
March 1979 events in Asia